is a Japanese light novel series written by Okemaru and illustrated by Saba Mizore. It was initially serialized as a web novel on the user-generated novel publishing website Shōsetsuka ni Narō in December 2018. It was later acquired by Hobby Japan who began publishing it as a light novel in June 2020 under their HJ Bunko light novel imprint. A manga adaptation illustrated by Popuri Yoshikita began serialization on Kadokawa Shoten's Shōnen Ace Plus website in March 2021. An anime television series adaptation produced by Studio Gokumi and AXsiZ is set to premiere in 2023.

Characters

The main protagonist. He was passionately approaching his classmate, Aika Natsukawa, but he suddenly came to his senses and tried to distance himself from Aika.

The female lead. She is the beautiful girl in her class. She is bewildered by Wataru Sajō's sudden change in attitude and her own feelings of confusion.

Aika's best friend. She is a positive girl who joins the volleyball club.

Wataru's older sister. She is the vice president of the student council.

Kaede's best friend. A cool-headed and beautiful moral public committee president.

Wataru's classmate and junior at part-time job.

Media

Light novel
Written by Okemaru, the series began serialization as a web novel on the user-generated novel publishing website Shōsetsuka ni Narō on December 7, 2018. It was later acquired by Hobby Japan who began publishing it as a light novel with illustrations by Saba Mizore under their HJ Bunko imprint on June 1, 2020. As of August 2022, seven volumes have been released.

Manga
A manga adaptation illustrated by Popuri Yoshikita began serialization on Kadokawa Shoten's Shōnen Ace Plus website on March 26, 2021. As of November 2022, it has been collected in three volumes.

Anime
An anime television series adaptation was announced on November 18, 2022. It is produced by Studio Gokumi and AXsiZ, and directed by Kazuomi Koga, with scripts written by Michiko Yokote, and character designs handled by Masaru Koseki. The series is set to premiere in 2023. The opening theme song will be performed by Kaori Ishihara.

See also
 I Kissed My Girlfriend's Little Sister?!, another light novel series illustrated by Saba Mizore
 Seiyū Radio no Ura Omote, another light novel series illustrated by Saba Mizore

References

External links
 
 
 
 

2020 Japanese novels
2021 manga
2023 anime television series debuts
Anime and manga based on light novels
AXsiZ
HJ Bunko
Japanese webcomics
Kadokawa Shoten manga
Light novels
Light novels first published online
Romantic comedy anime and manga
Shōnen manga
Shōsetsuka ni Narō
Studio Gokumi
Upcoming anime television series
Webcomics in print